Jyly-Suu, before 2003: Tambashat is a village in the Osh Region of Kyrgyzstan. It is part of the Alay District. Its population was 709 in 2021.

References

Populated places in Osh Region